The Hundred Flowers Award for Best Animation was first awarded by the China Film Association in 1962.

1980s

1960s

References

Animation
Awards for best animated feature film
Lists of films by award